Pellia is a small but widespread genus of liverworts in the cool and temperate regions of the northern hemisphere.  It is classified in order  Pelliales and is a member of the family  Pelliaceae within that order.

Süsswassertang, a plant grown submerged in aquaria was once considered to be Pellia endiviifolia, but is now known to be the indeterminate gametophyte of a Lomariopsis species, a type of fern.

Species 
Taxonomy based on work by Söderström et al. 2016
 Pellia cordaeana Trevisan 1877
 Pellia crispa Kummer 1875
 Pellia gottscheana Kreh 1909
 Pellia longifolia Kummer 1875
 Pellia undulata Kummer 1875
 (Apopellia) Grolle 1983a
 P. (A.) alpicola (Schuster 1991) Damsholt 2007 
 P. (A.) endiviifolia (Dickson 1801) Dumortier 1835 
 P. (A.) megaspora Schuster 1981
 (Pellia) Raddi 1818
 P. (P.) appalachiana Schuster 1991
 P. (P.) epiphylla (Linnaeus 1753) Corda 1829
 P. (P.) e. borealis (Lorbeer 1934) Messe 1981
 P. (P.) e. epiphylla Messe 1981
 P. (P.) neesiana (Gottsche 1867) Limpricht 1876
 P. (P.) n. columbiana (Krajina & Brayshaw) Schuster
 P. (P.) n. neesiana (Gottsche 1867) Limpricht 1876

References

Pelliales
Liverwort genera